Liolaemus ubaghsi, Ubaghs's leopard lizard, is a species of lizard in the family Iguanidae or the family Liolaemidae. The species is endemic to Chile.

References

ubaghsi
Lizards of South America
Reptiles of Chile
Endemic fauna of Chile
Reptiles described in 2014
Taxa named by Damien Esquerré
Taxa named by Jaime Troncoso-Palacios